Charles "Rich" Richard Patterson (1833 – 1910) was an African-American carriage manufacturer, entrepreneur and civil rights activist; he founded precursor companies to C.R. Patterson and Sons.

Early life 
Patterson was born in April 1833 as a slave on a Virginia plantation. He was the oldest of the thirteen children of Charles and Nancy Patterson. There are conflicting stories on how he left the plantation, he ended up living in Greenfield, Ohio, which was also the site of an underground railroad station. It is thought he left Virginia right before the American Civil War in 1861.

In c.1865, he married Josephine Utz (aka Outz, and Qutz), a mulatto woman of German descent. Together they had five children, Mary (1866), Frederick "Fred" Douglas (1871), Dorothea "Dollie" (c.1871), Samuel C. (1873), and Catherine "Kate" (1879).

Career 
He initially worked at Dines and Simpson Carriage and Coach Makers Company, and learned blacksmithing. Charles Patterson later formed a partnership with James P. Lowe (J. P. Lowe), a white man, they created J.P. Lowe & Company in 1873.

In 1880, he served as a trustee of the Greenfield African Methodist Episcopal Church (Greenfield A.M.E. Church) and served as a Sunday school teacher. When his oldest son  Fred was not allowed to attend the public high school due to racial segregation, Charles filed a court case, Patterson vs The Board of Education, in Highland County Court of Common Pleas with the help of Rev. James A. Shorter of his church. The verdict came in April 1887, and Patterson was allowed to attend the public school Greenfield High School.

In 1893, Charles Patterson bought out the remaining shares of the J. P. Lowe & Company and the name was changed to C.R. Patterson, Son & Company, to mark the inclusion of his son Samuel to the business. Samuel C. Patterson fell ill in 1897, and died in 1899. His eldest son Frederick Douglas Patterson moved home to help with the business.

After Charles R. Patterson's death on April 26, 1910, his son Frederick Douglas Patterson took over the carriage business and decided they needed to get into the "Patterson horseless carriage" business.

References

External links 

 

1833 births
1910 deaths
African-American businesspeople
American transportation businesspeople
People from Greenfield, Ohio
American former slaves
School desegregation pioneers
Activists for African-American civil rights
19th-century American businesspeople
20th-century African-American people